Coles Whalen is an Americana, pop and country singer-songwriter based in Denver. She has toured extensively through the United States and Canada and has released six independent records. Whalen also composed and performed the soundtrack to Passport & Palette, a Public Television Series, and is the voice of the Living Spaces 2010 ad campaign seen in Super Bowl XLIV.  In 2009, a writer for the St. Joseph News-Press described her music as "evolving from a stereotypical emotive folksy singer-songwriter into an artist who dabbles in crafting melodic pop mixed with touches of alt-country, rock and jazz." In January 2023, the Supreme Court of the United States agreed to review a case—Counterman v. Colorado—regarding the extent of First Amendment protection for threatening communications. Whalen was the victim of the threatening communications in the case.

Victim in Counterman v. Colorado “True Threats” Case 
From 2014-16, Coles Whalen received multiple threatening messages sent by Billy Raymond Counterman to her Facebook account.  After a jury trial, he was found guilty of stalking (serious emotional distress). The trial court sentenced him to prison. In July 2021, the Colorado Court of Appeals rejected Counterman’s argument that his jury had not been properly instructed and held that Counterman had made “true threats” to Whalen  The Court explained: “Most troubling are the messages that tell C.W. to ‘die’ or to ‘[f]uck off permanently.'
 
In January 2023, the Supreme Court of the United States agreed to review the case, specifically the question of whether, “to establish that a statement is a ‘true threat’ unprotected by the First Amendment, the government must show that the speaker subjectively knew or intended the threatening nature of the statement, or whether it is enough to show that an objective ‘reasonable person’ would regard the statement as a threat of violence.”

Following the Supreme Court’s decision to review the case, Coles Whalen released a statement: “The thousands of unstable messages sent to me were life threatening and life altering. I was terrified that I was being followed and could be hurt at any moment; I had no choice but to step back from my dream, a music career that I had worked very hard to build. As the Supreme Court weighs this issue, I hope it will consider how dangerous stalking is for victims and their families all over this country. … I am grateful that when I reported these alarming messages, they were taken seriously …. If you are afraid – please – trust yourself and reach out for help.”

Appearances 
South by Southwest 2016

Denver Pride Festival 2012 with En Vogue

HRC National Gala 
2011
Phoenix Pride Festival 30th Anniversary 2010 with Joan Jett

Akon's Hitlab Showcase, Winner 2009

Taos Solar Music Festival 2008 with Paula Cole, John Butler Trio

Discography 
Let's Be Lovers 2021
 We're Gonna Make it Right
 Let's Be Lovers
 I'll Make a Change
 Right Back to You
 Getaway Car
 Stop Drop and Roll
 Love Me Loving You
 Till the Next Life

Come Back, Come Back 2013
 Catch Hold
 Counting Down the Days
 Cruel Game
 There's Gotta Be
 More Than the Immediate
 Fairy Tale
 Go Back
 Tether
 Phone Lines
 On My Way to You

I Wrote This for You 2012
 Cannonball
 Average 20 Something
 Beautiful Without Me
 Cactus
 Chasing Cars by Snow Patrol
 So It Is
 These Small Things
 Wrecking Ball
 Wake Up Easy
 You'll Be There
 Can't Take My Eyes Off of You
 Paper Airplane
 Second to None

The Whistle Stop Road Record 2010
 Go Child
 Whistle Stop
 Butterflies
 Hole in My Heart
 Wrecking Ball
 So It Is
 Romeo and Juliet (by Mark Knopfler)
 Average 20 Something
 Call On Me
 Wake Up Easy
 Hurricane (Wicked Won Remix)

Nothing is Too Much 2008
Call on Me
How Do You Do This to Me
The Gettin' Side
When You Were Here
Honeyed Out

Gee Baby 2006
Shine
Manhattan
Turn Away
Ship That Sails The Sea
Twice
Weepin' Heart
Pretty Kids
Saint Tony
The Hand That Gives the Rose
Come Back for More
Sevens
Gee Baby

Coles Whalen: ep 2005
Why I Cry
Pick Up the Pieces
Sevens
Hollow Railroad
Providence
Old Man Reality

Songs for Sensational Kids Vol. 1: The Wiggly Scarecrow 2005

Personal background 
Coles Whalen is based in Denver, Colorado. She began her performance career with the Colorado Children's Chorale and traveled with the group throughout the United States and to China. She attended Cherry Creek High School and graduated from the University of Southern California. Whalen was the victim of the threatening communications in - Counterman v. Colorado - a case the Supreme Court of the United States agreed to review in Jan 2023.

References

External links 
 Coles Whalen Official Website
 Coles Whalen on Facebook
 Coles Whalen at AllMusic
 Ourstage Article

Living people
American women singer-songwriters
Year of birth missing (living people)
Musicians from Philadelphia
University of Southern California alumni
Place of birth missing (living people)
Singer-songwriters from Pennsylvania
Singers from Denver
21st-century American women
Singer-songwriters from Colorado